Alan Joel Higgins (sometimes credited as Al Higgins and Alan Higgins) is an American television writer and producer.

Higgins was born in Des Moines, Iowa, and is the brother of actor David Anthony Higgins and Saturday Night Live assistant producer/Late Night with Jimmy Fallon announcer Steve Higgins.

He was a writer and associate producer of the television series Malcolm in the Middle for the first three seasons, and came back as a creative consultant for season seven.

Higgins' other television credits include the first three seasons of NewsRadio, 'Til Death, Cracking Up, In the Motherhood, Cavemen, 100 Questions, Big Lake, Mike & Molly and Bob Hearts Abishola.

Filmography

Nominations

References

External links

American television producers
American television writers
American male television writers
Living people
Writers from Des Moines, Iowa
Year of birth missing (living people)
Screenwriters from Iowa